Bernard "Barney" Ramsden (8 November 1917 – March 1976) was an English professional footballer from Sheffield who played as a defender for Liverpool, Sunderland and Hartlepools United. After retiring from playing he became a representative for a ships chandlers firm in San Pedro.

References

External links
Profile at LFCHistory.net

1917 births
1976 deaths
English footballers
Footballers from Sheffield
Association football fullbacks
English Football League players
Liverpool F.C. players
Sunderland A.F.C. players
Hartlepool United F.C. players